The CAMS Australian S5000 Championship held two "launch events" or exhibition meetings in 2019, prior to the inaugural championship season in 2021. These meetings were held as part of the Shannons Nationals Motor Racing Championships, at Sandown Raceway on 21 and 22 September and The Bend Motorsport Park on 16 and 17 November.

Teams and drivers 
The following teams and drivers competed in the races. As the championship is a spec series, all competitors raced with an identical Onroak-Ligier chassis powered by a naturally-aspirated 5.0-litre Ford Coyote V8 engine.

Race calendar and meeting format
A provisional calendar had initially been announced in 2018, with Sydney Motorsport Park as the season opener and The Bend Motorsport Park as the concluding round. However, after the organisers announced that the series would be delayed four months due to supply issues as well as further S5000 car testing, the first race of the series was pushed back to 22 September, 2019 at Sandown Raceway.

At each meeting, a qualifying session, two qualifying heats and a Main Event were held. Meeting points were awarded to the fastest six qualifiers in qualifying. Drivers in the top 75% of the field then selected their grid position for the first qualifying heat (held on Saturday), with the top ten positions reversed for the second qualifying heat, held on Sunday. The grid for the Main Event was defined by the points earned by the drivers across the weekend, held later on Sunday.

 No meeting points were awarded for the feature races. The winner of the Main Event is deemed the winner of the event as a whole.

Race results

Sandown

Meeting points
(key)

Main Event

The Bend Motorsport Park

Meeting points
(key)

Main Event

Notes

References

Sources

External links

S5000 Championship